This is a list of bestselling novels in the United States in the 1940s, as determined by Publishers Weekly. The list features the most popular novels of each year from 1940 through 1949.

The standards set for inclusion in the lists – which, for example, lead to the exclusion of the novels in the Harry Potter series from the lists for the 1990s and 2000s – are currently unknown.

1940 
 How Green Was My Valley by Richard Llewellyn
 Kitty Foyle by Christopher Morley
 Mrs. Miniver by Jan Struther
 For Whom the Bell Tolls by Ernest Hemingway
 The Nazarene by Sholem Asch
 Stars on the Sea by F. Van Wyck Mason
 Oliver Wiswell by Kenneth Roberts
 The Grapes of Wrath by John Steinbeck
 Night in Bombay by Louis Bromfield
 The Family by Nina Fedorova

1941 
 The Keys of the Kingdom by A. J. Cronin
 Random Harvest by James Hilton
 This Above All by Eric Knight
 The Sun Is My Undoing by Marguerite Steen
 For Whom the Bell Tolls by Ernest Hemingway
 Oliver Wiswell by Kenneth Roberts
 H. M. Pulham, Esquire by John P. Marquand
 Mr. and Mrs. Cugat by Isabel Scott Rorick
 Saratoga Trunk by Edna Ferber
 Windswept by Mary Ellen Chase

1942 
 The Song of Bernadette by Franz Werfel
 The Moon Is Down by John Steinbeck
 Dragon Seed by Pearl S. Buck
 And Now Tomorrow by Rachel Field
 Drivin' Woman by Elizabeth Pickett
 Windswept by Mary Ellen Chase
 The Robe by Lloyd C. Douglas
 The Sun Is My Undoing by Marguerite Steen
 Kings Row by Henry Bellamann
 The Keys of the Kingdom by A. J. Cronin

1943 
 The Robe by Lloyd C. Douglas
 The Valley of Decision by Marcia Davenport
 So Little Time by John P. Marquand
 A Tree Grows in Brooklyn by Betty Smith
 The Human Comedy by William Saroyan
 Mrs. Parkington by Louis Bromfield
 The Apostle by Sholem Asch
 Hungry Hill by Daphne du Maurier
 The Forest and the Fort by Hervey Allen
 The Song of Bernadette by Franz Werfel

1944 
 Strange Fruit by Lillian Smith
 The Robe by Lloyd C. Douglas
 A Tree Grows in Brooklyn by Betty Smith
 Forever Amber by Kathleen Winsor
 The Razor's Edge by W. Somerset Maugham
 The Green Years by A. J. Cronin
 Leave Her to Heaven by Ben Ames Williams
 Green Dolphin Street by Elizabeth Goudge
 A Bell for Adano by John Hersey
 The Apostle by Sholem Asch

1945 
 Forever Amber by Kathleen Winsor
 The Robe by Lloyd C. Douglas
 The Black Rose by Thomas B. Costain
 The White Tower by James Ramsey Ullman
 Cass Timberlane by Sinclair Lewis
 A Lion Is in the Streets by Adria Locke Langley
 So Well Remembered by James Hilton
 Captain from Castile by Samuel Shellabarger
 Earth and High Heaven by Gwethalyn Graham
 Immortal Wife by Irving Stone

1946 
 The King's General by Daphne du Maurier
 This Side of Innocence by Taylor Caldwell
 The River Road by Frances Parkinson Keyes
 The Miracle of the Bells by Russell Janney
 The Hucksters by Frederic Wakeman, Sr.
 The Foxes of Harrow by Frank Yerby
 Arch of Triumph by Erich Maria Remarque
 The Black Rose by Thomas B. Costain
 B.F.'s Daughter by John P. Marquand
 The Snake Pit by Mary Jane Ward

1947 
 The Miracle of the Bells by Russell Janney
 The Moneyman by Thomas B. Costain
 Gentleman's Agreement by Laura Z. Hobson
 Lydia Bailey by Kenneth Roberts
 The Vixens by Frank Yerby
 The Wayward Bus by John Steinbeck
 House Divided by Ben Ames Williams
 Kingsblood Royal by Sinclair Lewis
 East Side, West Side by Marcia Davenport
 Prince of Foxes by Samuel Shellabarger

1948 
 The Big Fisherman by Lloyd C. Douglas
 The Naked and the Dead by Norman Mailer
 Dinner at Antoine's by Frances Parkinson Keyes
 The Bishop's Mantle by Agnes Sligh Turnbull
 Tomorrow Will Be Better by Betty Smith
 The Golden Hawk by Frank Yerby
 Raintree County by Ross Lockridge Jr.
 Shannon's Way by A. J. Cronin
 Pilgrim's Inn by Elizabeth Goudge
 The Young Lions by Irwin Shaw

1949 
 The Egyptian by Mika Waltari
 The Big Fisherman by Lloyd C. Douglas
 Mary by Sholem Asch
 A Rage to Live by John O'Hara
 Point of No Return by John P. Marquand
 Dinner at Antoine's by Frances Parkinson Keyes
 High Towers by Thomas B. Costain
 Cutlass Empire by F. Van Wyck Mason
 Pride's Castle by Frank Yerby
 Father of the Bride by Edward Streeter

References

1940s in the United States
Novels
1940s books